The Association for Computing Machinery SIGARCH Alan D. Berenbaum Distinguished Service Award is given for outstanding service in the field of computer architecture and design.

Recipients
Source:  ACM

 2019 - Margaret Martonosi
 2018 – Koen De Bosschere
 2016 – Michael Flynn
 2014 – Doug DeGroot
 2013 – Norman P. Jouppi
 2011 – David A. Patterson
 2010 – Janie Irwin
 2009 – Mark D. Hill
 2008 – Alan Berenbaum

See also

 ACM Special Interest Group on Computer Architecture
 Computer engineering
 Computer science
 Computing
 Service
 List of computer-related awards
 List of computer science awards

References

External links
 ACM SIGARCH Alan D. Berenbaum Distinguished Service Award

Computer-related awards
Computer science awards
Distinguished service awards